Pakistanism or Pakistanization  is a neologism that refers to the continual division of any society along religious lines.

In Europe, Alija Izetbegović, the first President of the Republic of Bosnia and Herzegovina, began to embrace the "Pakistan model" in the 1960s, alienating Serbs which would use this ideology to attack Bosniaks later on, while in his Islamic Declaration he "designated Pakistan as a model country to be emulated by Muslim revolutionaries worldwide."

Some West Africans were inspired by the Indian independence movement. In 1920, educated West Africans formed the National Congress of British West Africa, which modeled its name on the Indian National Congress. According to Ali Mazrui, the facet of the Indian independence movement West Africans found most admirable was the Indian peoples' unity during the struggle. In 1936, H. O. Davies said,

"Africans should follow India – the only way is for Africans to co-operate and make sacrifices in the struggle for freedom."

According to Ali Mazrui,

"But the emergence of the Muslim League in India as a serious secessionist movement soon shattered the myth of unity in the Indian model. A new word entered the vocabulary of West African nationalism – the word was 'pakistanism'."

Ghana's Kwame Nkrumah and Nigeria's Nnamdi Azikiwe became concerned about possible Pakistanization in their respective countries and Africa as a whole. The Convention People's Party's 1954 Election Manifesto contain the following message:

"We have seen the tragedy of religious communalism in India and elsewhere. Don't let us give it a chance to take root and flourish in Ghana. Down with Pakistanism!"

Nigeria
Pakistanism became a concern in Nigeria's independence movement. The primary subdivisions of Nigeria consisted of the Hausa-Fulani-dominated Northern Region, the Yoruba-dominated Western Region, and the Igbo-dominated Eastern Region. In addition to  these ethnic differences, the Northern Region was primarily Muslim, while the Western and Eastern regions were primarily Christian. In the 1950s, the Northern Region threatened to secede. Godfrey Mwakikagile noted that it was the Northern region that was the first region threatening to secede. At the 1950 General Conference at Ibadan, Northern Region delegates demanded 50% of the seats in Nigeria's legislature and threatened secession otherwise. In 1958, Nnamdi Azikiwe said:

"It is essential that ill-will be not created in order to encourage a Pakistan in this country."

The original goal of the countercoup against the government of Johnson Aguiyi-Ironsi on July 29, 1966, was to facilitate the Northern Region's secession from the rest of Nigeria.

Sudan
In February 2011, Mazrui used the term to describe the division of the Sudan into Sudan proper, which is primarily Muslim, and South Sudan, which is primarily Christian and animistic.

See also

Two-nation theory
Balkanization

References

Africa–Pakistan relations
Political terminology in Pakistan
Pakistan studies
Political neologisms
Religion and society
Pakistani social culture